The Hochschule für Grafik und Buchkunst (HGB) or Academy of Fine Arts Leipzig is one of the oldest art schools in Germany, dating back to 1764. The school has four colleges specializing in fine arts, graphic design, photography and new media art.

It is the home of two notable modern art movements, the so-called Leipzig School and New Leipzig School.

References

Hochschule für Grafik und Buchkunst Leipzig